Hydrazinium is the cation with the formula . This cation has a methylamine-like structure. It can be derived from hydrazine by protonation (treatment with a strong acid). Hydrazinium is a weak acid with pKa = 8.1.

Salts of hydrazinium are common reagents in chemistry and are often used in certain industrial processes. In the common names of such salts, the cation is often called "hydrazine", as in "hydrazine sulfate" for hydrazinium hydrogensulfate.

The terms "hydrazinium" and "hydrazine" may also be used for the doubly protonated cation , more properly called hydrazinediium or hydrazinium(2+). This cation has an ethane-like structure. Salts of this cation include hydrazinediium sulfate  and hydrazinediium bis(6-carboxypyridazine-3-carboxylate), .

See also

Ammonium,

References

Hydrazinium compounds
Cations